Malikwal is a tehsil located in Mandi Bahauddin District, Punjab, Pakistan. The city of Malikwal is the headquarters of the tehsil, which is administratively subdivided into 17 Union Councils.

References

Mandi Bahauddin District
Tehsils of Punjab, Pakistan